Events from the year 1581 in France

Incumbents
 Monarch – Henry III

Events

Births

Full date missing
Jean du Vergier de Hauranne, Catholic priest (died 1643)
Claude Bouthillier, statesman (died 1652)
Claude Gaspard Bachet de Méziriac, mathematician, linguist and poet (died 1638)
Jean-Baptiste d'Ornano, nobleman and Marshall of France (died 1626)
Achille Harlay de Sancy, diplomat (died 1646)
Clément Métezeau, engineer (died 1652)
Jean Chalette, painter (died 1643)
December 27 – Jean Chalette, French painter

Deaths

Full date missing
Odet de Turnèbe, dramatist (born 1552)
Georgette de Montenay (born 1540)

See also

References

1580s in France